

MPs by party

Serbia politics-related lists
1992 in Serbia
1993 in Serbia
1992 in politics
1993 in politics